The Union Church is an historic church and local history museum owned by the Portsmouth Historical Society at 870 East Main Road at Union Street in Portsmouth, Rhode Island.  One exhibit room is dedicated to Julia Ward Howe and includes a collection of furniture from her summer home in Portsmouth and a display about her life.

History

The Union Church building was constructed in 1865 at the cost of $7,000 for the congregation of the Portsmouth Christian Union Church, which was founded in 1810 and originally met in homes and then a smaller meeting house. The congregation was active until after World War I.  The last worship service was held in 1937 and then it was declared a defunct organization by the Superior Court in 1940 with the fourteen remaining members voting to donate the property to the Portsmouth Historical Society. It now houses the majority of the historical society's collections.

The former church building was added to the National Register of Historic Places in 1974.

Adjacent to the church is a 1725 schoolhouse building. The Society opens the museum buildings weekly.

See also
National Register of Historic Places listings in Newport County, Rhode Island

References

External links

Portsmouth Historical Society

Churches completed in 1865
Churches on the National Register of Historic Places in Rhode Island
Museums in Newport County, Rhode Island
History museums in Rhode Island
Biographical museums in Rhode Island
Education museums in the United States
Buildings and structures in Portsmouth, Rhode Island
Women's museums in the United States
National Register of Historic Places in Newport County, Rhode Island
Former churches in Rhode Island